The Canadian Army Trophy (CAT) was a tank gunnery competition established to foster excellence, camaraderie and competition among the armoured forces of the NATO countries in Western Europe.

The trophy is a miniature sterling silver replica of a Canadian Army Centurion tank. It is now located at CFB (Canadian Forces Base) Gagetown in New Brunswick, Canada; home of the Canadian Armour School.

Origins 

The Canadian Army Trophy (CAT) competition started in 1963 when the Canadian government donated a silver replica of a Centurion tank to the country that obtained the highest score during a tank gunnery competition that was hosted by the Canadian Army 4th Mechanized Brigade forward deployed in West Germany. This tank replica later became known as the Canadian Army Trophy for NATO Tank Gunnery. The competition was established to foster excellence, camaraderie and competition among the armor forces of the NATO countries in Western Europe. The winner of the Canadian Army Trophy, which remains the property of Canada, retains it until the next competition and is responsible for its safe custody. The competition was held annually through 1968; and in 1970 it was decided that it would be held every two years at Bergen-Hohne, West Germany beginning with a competition in 1973; later the competition would also be held at Grafenwöhr. Each member country was invited to field a 'team' (a tank company of four platoons of 3 AFVs) to represent their respective Armies.  Nations represented included Canada, Belgium, United Kingdom, the Netherlands, West Germany and the United States.

Since 1963 the competition format has undergone numerous changes. Originally, single tanks fired from fixed points at known ranges. Following the 1968 and again after the 1975 competitions, the rules and procedures of the competition were changed to more accurately reflect combat conditions. The 1970, 1973 and 1975 competitions incorporated tank sections, consisting of two tanks; while beginning in the 1977 competition, 3-tank platoons (or strong sections for 5-tank platoons) are now required to fire and move over a course, termed a "battle run," designed to test their gunnery skills under more realistic conditions. Each battle run consists of firing from stationary positions and while on the move, at both stationary and moving targets. 4-Tank platoons were incorporated beginning with the 1981 competition. The trophy and awards were given to the best scoring team.

After the 1981 competition, additional changes were made to provide better means of achieving the aims of the CAT competition and to reflect the intended nature of the event, namely, a competition among the land forces of the Central Region. Accordingly, the 1983 CAT competition format organized units from the six participating nations (Belgium, Canada, Germany, Netherlands, United Kingdom, and the United States) in teams corresponding to their army group assignments within the Central Region. Units were therefore either members of the Northern Army Group (NORTHAG) or Central Army Group (CENTAG). The Canadian Army Trophy is now presented to the winning Army Group and awards were given to the three best scoring platoons of each Army Group. The winner of the Canadian Army Trophy,
which remains the property of Canada, retains it until the next competition and is responsible for its safe custody.

NORTHAG consisted of the British Army of the Rhine (BAOR)'s British I Corps, American 2nd Armored Division (Forward), German I Corps, Netherlands' I Corps, and Belgian I Corps. CENTAG consisted of the German II and III Corps, the American V and VII Corps, and the Canadian 4th Brigade.

The responsibility of organizing and hosting the competition rotated between the different participating nations. In 1981 the responsibility shifted to the two Army Groups, Central Army Group (CENTAG) or Northern Army Group (NORTHAG). When CENTAG hosted the competition, it was held in Grafenwöhr; likewise when NORTHAG hosted, it was in Bergen-Hohne.

The failures of a nation's entrant to place well at the CAT have had considerable defence industry impact. The showing of the UK's Royal Hussars at the 1987 competition was the subject of a front-page story in London's Sunday Telegraph, June 21, 1987, titled "NATO Allies Outgun Britain's New Battle Tanks". However, in battle conditions the British entry went on to be recognised as arguably the world's pre-eminent tank.

Winners

CAT '77 

The 1977 competition was the first time an American team had participated, C Company 2-81 Armor; but came in last place.
The competition was held in Bergen-Hohne, West Germany, 25–29 April 1977. Hosted by United Kingdom. The Royal Canadian Dragoons team that had received its first Leopard tank four months earlier won. It was held on Range 9.

CAT '79 

The 1979 competition was held at Range 9, Bergen Hohne. The US built Range 10 at Grafenwöhr for the CAT competition training, it was used later for the actual 1981 competition. There were 20 platoons competing from Belgium, Canada, the United Kingdom, West Germany and the United States. The Netherlands team did not compete due to a contractual issue with their military union. 1979 was the first year the US team (M Company, 3/2nd ACR in 1979) did not finish last. M Company, 2nd Armored Cavalry Regiment, won recognition as the high scoring tank platoon in USAEUR tank gunnery in 1978 (1st Platoon, Lt. Andersson), with platoon leaders Lt. Krause (3rd), and Lt. Socha (2nd) following closely. Several individual crew members extended their tour with M Company, 3/2 ACR and carried considerable experience with them to the competition.

CAT '81 

The 1981 competition was held on Range 10 at Grafenwöhr. There were 24 platoons competing from Belgium, Canada, the United Kingdom, the Netherlands, West Germany and the United States. The M60A3 used by the USA entry was the final development of the M60A3 until the 2001 IFCS modification produced by Raytheon and sold to Jordan.The United Kingdom was represented by the Queen's Own Hussars.

CAT '83 

Held on Range 9 at Bergen-Hohne on 20 to 24 June, teams competed corresponding to their army group assignments within the Central Region, from Northern Army Group (NORTHAG) or Central Army Group (CENTAG). NORTHAG consisted of the British Army of the Rhine (BAOR)'s British I Corps, American III Corps Forward, German I Corps, Netherlands' I Corps, and Belgian I Corps. CENTAG consisted of the German II and III Corps, the American V and VII Corps, and 4 Canadian Mechanized Brigade Group.

This was the first year that the M1 Abrams participated in the competition, utilized by Charlie Company, 3/64 Armor Battalion, 3rd Infantry Division. The other two US tank companies were utilizing the M60 Patton tank. With the M1, Charlie Company's three platoons scored in second, third and eighth place. 1st Platoon Charlie Company, shooting on Day 1, scored in Second place overall with 19,294 points behind West Germany's 1st Platoon 2nd Company, 293rd Panzer Battalion. The West German Platoon, shooting on Day 3 after seeing all of the target arrays, won with the highest score of 21,153 points out of a maximum of 28,100 with their Leopard 1 tank. Charlie Company's Third Platoon shot third place with 18,068 points, and the Second Platoon shot eighth place with 16,116 points.  

Many individuals involved with Charlie Company for CAT '83 extended their tour of duty of Germany to participate in CAT '85 with Alpha Company, 3/64 Armor. Finally, Charlie Company, 2/66 Armor surprised the competition by placing with its old M60A1 tanks, which used optical rangefinder technology from the World War II era. This showed the value of local course knowledge over pure technology.

CAT '85 

The M1IP Abrams made its debut in the 1985 competition held on Range 9 at Bergen-Hohne, which contained small upgrades to the M1 Abrams that was previously used for the first time in the 1983 competition. This was the first direct competition of the German Leopard II and the US M1 Abrams. For the second time an American platoon, 1st Platoon of A Company 3-64 Armor, had scored 2nd overall in the competition and the United States' teams ranked third for the entire competition. B Company 3-32 Armor, of the 3rd Armored Division, used the M-60A3; the oldest generation of tanks during the competition.

C / 2-66 Armor competed with its new M1 tanks, but severe weather storms at the moment of their runs hampered visibility and caused them to underperform.

Two platoons from Royal Canadian Dragoons came last and 18th out of 20. This furthered domestic criticism about Canada's commitment to Europe's defense as well as the quality of its military.

CAT '87 

In the 1987 competition held on Range 301 center lane at Grafenwöhr, there were a total of 24 platoons competing (12 from NORTHAG and 12 from CENTAG). There were significant rules and conditions changes made that governed the preparation and conduct of the competition, each Army Group would designate a minimum of one company from two different battalions; each separate brigade designates a minimum of two companies per country's Corps. The random selection of the tank companies to compete would be made by AFCENT (Allied Forces Central Europe) no later than 1 April 1987. NORTHAG fielded teams from Belgium, UK, the Netherlands, West Germany and the United States. CENTAG fielded teams from Canada, West Germany and the United States. The British (3-tank) tank platoons were presented 24 targets, while the other countries' 4-tank platoons were presented with 32 targets during the battle runs. Scoring was based on target hits, hit times, ammunition bonuses (only if all targets were hit), and hit bonuses (only if all targets were hit), machine gun hits, and penalties with a maximum platoon score of 22,600 points. The main gun targets were at ranges between 1,600-3,000 meters and would remain standing after being hit until presentation time, 40 seconds, had expired. No target would be presented twice, so the judges could actually count holes in the targets to verify target hits; "cookie bites" did not count as hits. This was the first year that United States won the CAT and had two platoons placing among the top three; 1st platoon D Company 4-8 Cavalry took top tank platoon honors and 1st Platoon A Company 3-64 Armor, scored third in the competition.

CAT '87 Teams by firing order for each Army Group 

 NORTHAG

 , Royal Hussars, B Squadron, 3rd Troop
 , PzBtl 324, 4th Company, 3rd Platoon
 , 43 TkBat, C Company, 1st Platoon
 , 2-66 Armor, D Company, 1st Platoon
 , 4 Lanciers, A Company, 3rd Platoon
 , 2-66 Armor, D Company, 2nd Platoon
 , 43 TkBat, C Company, 3rd Platoon
 , PzBtl 324, 4th Company, 1st Platoon
 , Royal Hussars, B Squadron, 1st Troop
 , 2-66 Armor, D Company, 3rd Platoon
 , 4 Lanciers, A Company, 1st Platoon
 , Royal Hussars, B Squadron, 2nd Troop

 CENTAG     (awarded the trophy)

 , 3-64 Armor, A Company, 2nd Platoon
 , 4-8 Cav, D Company, 3rd Platoon
 , Royal Canadian Dragoons, C Squadron, 1st Troop
 , PzBtl 124, 4th Company, 2nd Platoon
 , PzBtl 363, 3rd Company, 1st Platoon
 , Royal Canadian Dragoons, C Squadron, 2nd Troop
 , 3-64 Armor, A Company, 3rd Platoon
 , 4-8 Cav, D Company, 2nd Platoon
 , PzBtl 363, 3rd Company, 2nd Platoon
 , PzBtl 124,4th Company, 1st Platoon Second Place
 , 3-64 Armor, A Company, 1st Platoon, Third Place
 , 4-8 Cav, D Company, 1st Platoon, First Place

CAT '89 

The United Kingdom did not field a team during the 1989 competition held on Range 9 at Bergen-Hohne. It was the only time that night battle runs were incorporated into the competition. Cat '89 was won by the Dutch 41 Tankbat Alfa esquadron.

CAT '91 
The United States and United Kingdom did not field teams due to the Gulf War, and hence it was a competition solely between Leopard 1 and Leopard 2 tanks. This was to be the last competition as the 4 Canadian Mechanized Brigade Group left Germany in 1993, resulting in the end of the CAT competitions.

CANAM Cup 

In 1997 the competition began again, but only between the United States and Canada as the CANAM Cup. The Canadians won in 1997, 2000, and 2002. The American teams won in 1999 and 2003.

Results

1963

1964

1965

1966

1967

1968

1970

1973

1975

1977

11 tankbataljon / B squadron / 2e troop - winning troop of tanks.

1979

1981

1983

1985

1987

1989

1991

See also 
 Military exercise
 Cold War
 Tank Biathlon
 Strong Europe Tank Challenge
 Worthington Trophy

References

External links 
 3rd US Armored Division at CAT 1987 - A tribute to the 3AD victory in 1987 at the "World Series of Tank Gunnery"
 43rd Tank Battalion CAT page - A Dutch page about the 43rd tank battalion's participations in the competition
 Historical records: patches, scores, dates, videos and statistics of CAT - A site of units' participation in the CAT competition

Tanks
Canadian Army
NATO
Military excellence competitions
Military sport in Canada
Canadian military exercises
Canada and NATO